Summit Valley may refer to:
Summit Valley (Los Angeles County, California), a valley south of Woodland Hills
Summit Valley (San Bernardino County, California), a valley along SR 138 east of Cajon Pass
A former name for Soda Springs, Nevada County, California